The official language of the Czech Republic is Czech. German, Polish, Hungarian, and Ukrainian are recognized as official minority languages. Vietnamese and Belarusian became officially recognized as minority languages in the Czech Republic in 2013, which included the right to use those languages in courts and public places as well as in broadcast radio and television. The Czech Republic signed the European Charter for Regional or Minority Languages in 2000. Romany, Slovak, and Croatian are also spoken in the country.

References 

Languages of the Czech Republic
Czech Republic